February 1974 general election may refer to:
 1974 Burmese general election
 1974 Liechtenstein general election
 February 1974 United Kingdom general election